Eucarta virgo, the silvery gem, is a moth of the family Noctuidae. The species first described by Georg Friedrich Treitschke in 1835. It can be found in south, southeast and central Europe.

The wingspan is 25–36 mm.

The larvae feed on Artemisia vulgaris, Artemisia campestris and Tanacetum vulgare.

References

External links
Moths and Butterflies of Europe and North Africa
Fauna Europaea
Lepiforum e. V.
Bernd Schacht's Noctuidae.de

Amphipyrinae
Moths of Japan
Moths of Europe
Taxa named by Georg Friedrich Treitschke
Moths described in 1835